The Königstuhl, is a  high hill in the Odenwald Mountains and in the city of Heidelberg, in the German state of Baden-Württemberg. The Königstuhl summit allows visitors views of the city of Heidelberg and the Neckar river. On days with good conditions the view extends to the Pfaelzerwald (Palatinate Forest), which is roughly 40–50 km away.

The hill is linked to Altstadt, by the Heidelberger Bergbahn, a two section historic funicular railway that stops at Heidelberg Castle, located on the lower slopes of the Königstuhl, the Molkenkur restaurant/hotel, and the ultimate stop at the mountain top which host a restaurant, an entertainment park for kids and various walking paths.

The Max Planck Institute for Astronomy is located near the summit of the Königstuhl, as is the historic Landessternwarte Heidelberg-Königstuhl astronomical observatory, established in 1898. Between 1912 and 1957, Karl Wilhelm Reinmuth discovered almost 400 asteroids whilst working from this observatory.

Several telecommunications facilities are located on the Königstuhl, including the Fernsehturm Heidelberg (Digital TV (DVB-T), Radio and Microwave), the Telecom Telecommunication Tower Heidelberg (Microwave and FM) and the now inactive Telecommunication Tower of US-Forces Heidelberg (Microwave).

References

Geography of Heidelberg
Mountains and hills of Baden-Württemberg
Tourist attractions in Heidelberg